C. Kandaswami Naidu College for Men, is a general degree college located at Anna Nagar, Chennai, Tamil Nadu. It was established in the year 1967. The college is affiliated with University of Madras. This college offers different courses in arts, commerce and science.

Departments

Shift-I
Science

Physics
Chemistry
Mathematics

Arts and Commerce

Economics
Commerce

Shift-II
Science

Computer Application

Arts and Commerce

English
Commerce

Accreditation
The college is  recognized by the University of Madras (UGC).

See also
Education in India
Literacy in India
List of institutions of higher education in Tamil Nadu

References

External links
https://web.archive.org/web/20170921220908/http://cknc.edu.in/

Educational institutions established in 1967
1967 establishments in Madras State
Colleges affiliated to University of Madras
Universities and colleges in Chennai